Mavis Gibson is a Zimbabwean lawyer and judge who served on the High Court of Zimbabwe and was the first female and longest serving-justice of the High Court of Namibia.

Born Mavis Gumede in Zimbabwe, Gibson was originally a journalist. In the 1970s, she was a barrister with chambers in Lincoln's Inn, London.

Gibson was a Judge of the High Court of Zimbabwe for eleven years. Although some sources identify Gibson as Zimbabwe's first female judge, Kelello Justina Mafoso-Guni holds the distinction of becoming the country's first woman magistrate in 1980.

Gibson was appointed a Judge of Namibia's High Court on 18 December 1995. At times she also served as an Acting Judge of Appeal of the Supreme Court of Namibia. On her retirement in April 2008 she was the longest-serving member of the High Court.

See also
List of first women lawyers and judges in Africa

References

Zimbabwean women lawyers
20th-century Zimbabwean judges
Namibian judges
Women judges